Machlotica is a genus of sedge moths. It was described by Edward Meyrick in 1909.

Species
 Machlotica chrysodeta
 Machlotica eurymolybda
 Machlotica porphyrospila

References

External links
  Machlotica at Global Species

Glyphipterigidae